Romain Arneodo and Hugo Nys were the defending champions but lost in the quarterfinals to Benjamin Bonzi and Antoine Hoang.

Bonzi and Hoang won the title after defeating Dan Added and Michael Geerts 6–3, 6–1 in the final.

Seeds

Draw

References

External links
 Main draw

Play In Challenger - Doubles